German submarine U-776 was a Type VIIC U-boat of Nazi Germany's Kriegsmarine during World War II.

She was ordered on 21 November 1940, and was laid down on 4 March 1943, at Kriegsmarinewerft, Wilhelmshaven, as yard number 159. She was launched on 4 March 1944, and commissioned under the command of Oberleutnant zur See Lothar Martin on 13 April 1944.

Design
German Type VIIC submarines were preceded by the shorter Type VIIB submarines. U-776 had a displacement of  when at the surface and  while submerged. She had two shafts and two  propellers.

U-776 was fitted with five  torpedo tubes (four fitted at the bow and one at the stern), fourteen torpedoes or 26 TMA mines, one  SK C/35 naval gun, (220 rounds), one  Flak M42 and two twin  C/30 anti-aircraft guns. The boat had a complement of between 44 — 52 men.

Service history
U-776 participated in one war patrol that yielded no ships sunk or damaged.

On 16 May 1945, U-776 surrendered at Portland, UK. For a brief time she was designated N-65, a British N-class submarine, and toured the British coast and used for tests.  She was later transferred to Loch Ryan, Scotland. Of the 156 U-boats that eventually surrendered to the Allied forces at the end of the war, U-776 was one of 116 selected to take part in Operation Deadlight. U-776 was towed out on 3 December 1945, but sank after foundering on the way to the designated area. She was one of 56 U-boats that sank before reaching the scuttling areas.

References

Bibliography

External links

German Type VIIC submarines
U-boats commissioned in 1944
World War II submarines of Germany
Ships built in Wilhelmshaven
1943 ships
Maritime incidents in December 1945
World War II shipwrecks in the Atlantic Ocean
Operation Deadlight